Oyama, Ōyama or Ohyama may refer to:

 Oyama, Tochigi, a city in Japan
 Ōyama, Ōita, a town in Japan
 Oyama, Shizuoka, a town in Japan
 Mount Ōyama (Kanagawa), a mountain in Japan
 Oyama (Japanese theatre), also known as onnagata, a male actor who plays female parts in Kabuki
 Oyama, British Columbia, a town in Lake Country, British Columbia, Canada

People with the surname
Anza Ohyama (born 1976), Japanese singer and actress
Heiichiro Ohyama, Japanese conductor and violinist
Kana Oyama (born 1984), Japanese volleyball player
Ōyama Iwao, Japanese field marshal
Oyama Susumu (born 1952), Japanese sumo wrestler
Mas Oyama, karate master
, Japanese speed skater
, Japanese karateka
Shungo Oyama, Japanese mixed martial artist
Takashi Ohyama, Japanese dentist
 Yasuharu Ōyama, Japanese shogi player
 Zac Oyama, a CollegeHumor cast member

See also 
 Oyama v. California (1948), a United States Supreme Court case
 Mount Daisen (Japanese: 大山), written with the same characters as "Ōyama", but using on'yomi reading
 Koyama (disambiguation) (Japanese: 小山), written with the same characters as the geographical "Oyama", but using an alternative kun'yomi reading

Japanese-language surnames